Mercy Hospital is a 488-bed acute care hospital located in Coconut Grove, Miami, Florida. It is Miami-Dade County's only Catholic hospital.

Mercy Hospital was established in 1950. It was a member of the Catholic Health East until it was sold to HCA. It is sponsored by the Sisters of St. Joseph of St. Augustine, Florida. The hospital has 2,300 full-time employees.

Births
 Mexican Pop singer Paulina Rubio gave birth to her second son on March 5, 2016.

Deaths
Carlos Andrés Pérez

References

Hospital buildings completed in 1950
Catholic hospitals in North America
Hospitals established in 1950
Hospitals in Florida
Buildings and structures in Miami
Coconut Grove (Miami)
1950 establishments in Florida
Catholic health care